The Best of DMX is the third compilation and greatest hits album of DMX music released on January 26, 2010 by Ruff Ryders Entertainment and Def Jam Recordings. Due to DMX's departure from Def Jam Recordings, only songs that were released during his time there are included on this album. Most of the songs on the album were initially released as singles from his 5 studio albums released by Ruff Ryders Entertainment and Def Jam Recordings or singles from movie soundtracks he contributed to. It consists of songs deemed to be DMX's best by Def Jam Recordings. 

Unlike previous albums and compilations, this album features the unedited version of "Where The Hood At" (with the words "reload" and "slugs" which had been cut out on the Grand Champ version). Following DMX's death, the album jumped to the number 2 spot on the Billboard 200 up from its position of 73 a week earlier.

Track listing 

Notes
 Tracks 20 and 21 are only on the digital releases and not the physical.

Charts

Weekly charts

Year-end charts

Certifications

Sources 
 https://www.amazon.com/Best-Dmx/dp/B003102JEG/ref=sr_1_1?ie=UTF8&s=music&qid=1270628686&sr=8-1

References 

DMX (rapper) albums
2010 greatest hits albums
Albums produced by Irv Gotti
Albums produced by Swizz Beatz
Def Jam Recordings compilation albums
Ruff Ryders Entertainment compilation albums
Gangsta rap compilation albums